The following table lists the names of Breton communities which have concluded town twinning agreements with communities in Cornwall:

See also

 Irish and Breton twin towns
 List of Welsh towns twinned with a Breton town

External links
 Twinning Committee for Cornwall

 
 
cornwall
Twin towns